JNJ-Q2 is a broad-spectrum fluoroquinolone antibacterial drug being developed for the treatment of acute bacterial skin and skin-structure infections and community-acquired pneumonia. Specifically, JNJ-Q2 is being actively studied for treatment of methicillin-resistant Staphylococcus aureus (MRSA) infections.

Furiex Pharmaceuticals has licensed JNJ-Q2 from Janssen Pharmaceutica, a unit of Johnson & Johnson, which discovered JNJ-Q2.  Furiex is responsible for its development and commercialization. Both oral and intravenous formulations are being developed.

As of 2016, tests are ongoing.

References 

Cyclopropanes
Piperidines
Fluoroquinolone antibiotics